Doniaga  is a small village in De Fryske Marren municipality in the province Friesland of the Netherlands and has around 100 citizens (2017).

History
The village was first mentioned in 1448 as Doyenga. In 1840, it was home to 104 people. It used to have a little village centre with a school, inn, church and library, but only the belfry remains. The church was demolished in the 19th century. The belfry dates from 1901.

Before 2009, Doniaga was part of the Skarsterlân municipality and before 1984 it was part of Doniawerstal.

Gallery

References

External links

De Fryske Marren
Populated places in Friesland